Alexandre Feller (born 28 September 1971) is a Brazilian futsal player who plays for Marca Futsal as a Goalkeeper.

Alexandre Feller is a member of the Italian national futsal team.

Honours
  Leagues: 2
Luparense: 2006–2007, 2007–2008
Coppa Italia: 4
Prato: 2003-2004
Luparense: 2005–2006, 2007–2008
Arzignano: 2008-2009
 Supercoppa Italiana: 1
Luparense: 2007

References

External links
Futsalplanet profile

1971 births
Living people
Brazilian men's futsal players
Italian men's futsal players
Luparense Calcio a 5 players
Marca Futsal players
Brazilian emigrants to Italy
Futsal goalkeepers
Brazilian people of German descent
Italian people of German descent